Aesthesiothrips is a genus of thrips in the family Phlaeothripidae.

Species
 Aesthesiothrips jatrophae

References

Phlaeothripidae
Thrips genera